Martin Lučka (born March 10, 1985) is a Czech former professional ice hockey defenceman.

Lučka played a total of 333 games in the Czech Extraliga with HC Zlín, HC Karlovy Vary, Piráti Chomutov and HC Vítkovice. He also played in the Elite Ice Hockey League for the Edinburgh Capitals, the GET-ligaen for Frisk Asker and the Polska Hokej Liga for Podhale Nowy Targ.

References

External links

1985 births
Living people
Czech ice hockey defencemen
Edinburgh Capitals players
Frisk Asker Ishockey players
SHK Hodonín players
Sportovní Klub Kadaň players
HC Karlovy Vary players
People from Uherské Hradiště
Peterborough Petes (ice hockey) players
Piráti Chomutov players
Podhale Nowy Targ players
Scorpions de Mulhouse players
SK Horácká Slavia Třebíč players
HC Vítkovice players
PSG Berani Zlín players
Sportspeople from the Zlín Region
Czech expatriate ice hockey people
Czech expatriate sportspeople in Poland
Czech expatriate sportspeople in Scotland
Expatriate ice hockey players in Scotland
Czech expatriate sportspeople in Norway
Expatriate ice hockey players in Norway
Czech expatriate sportspeople in France
Expatriate ice hockey players in France
Czech expatriate ice hockey players in Canada